Paras Laxmikant Mhambrey  (born 9 June 1972) is a former Indian cricketer who played in two Test matches and three One Day Internationals between 1996 and 1998.

Playing career

In 1993–94,  Mhambrey made his debut took 30 wickets at 23.77 apiece and selected to the India A side in the next season.

Mhambrey made his debut against England at Edgbaston as a third seamer in 1996 and picked up as his first wicket haul Michael Atherton, however he could not do much with the ball and ended up with only 5 wickets in his only series. He was also selected as the overseas player for North Maidenhead CC.

Coaching career

Paras Mhambrey secured a Level-3 coaching diploma from the National Cricket Academy (NCA) in Bangalore.

He was the coach of the cricket team of Bengal in Indian domestic circuit and took them to the finals of the Ranji Trophy, after a gap of 16 years. He was also the coach of Maharashtra, Baroda and Vidarbha. He was the assistant coach of the Mumbai Indians in the Indian Premier League for four years.

He was the bowling coach for both India A team and U19 Indian cricket team until November 2021.

In November 2021, he was appointed as bowling coach of the Indian national cricket team.

References

External links 
 

1972 births
Living people
Indian cricketers
India Test cricketers
India One Day International cricketers
Mumbai cricketers
West Zone cricketers
Cricketers at the 1998 Commonwealth Games
Indian cricket coaches
Commonwealth Games competitors for India